Giuliana De Sio (born 2 April 1956) is an Italian actress, the younger sister of pop-folk singer Teresa De Sio. She won two David di Donatello for Best Actress and different Silver Ribbons for Best Actress.

Biography and career
Giuliana De Sio was born in Salerno and grew up in Cava de' Tirreni, where her family is originally from. De Sio's first public appearance was when she was five years old in a show at Teatro Verdi in Salerno. She moved to Terrasini when she was eighteen to live in a hippy commune before relocating to Rome, where she befriended Teresa Ann Savoy and Alessandro Haber, who encouraged her to take up acting.  Her professional debut was in 1976 when Gianni Bongiovanni choose her for the RAI TV film Una donna. Elio Petri then gave her a part in Mani sporche and Tonino Cervi choose her to star in Il malato immaginario together with Alberto Sordi.

In the early 1980s she met with Massimo Troisi, who cast her in a major role in his second film, Scusate il ritardo (1982). She later worked with Francesco Nuti in The Pool Hustlers (1982) and Casablanca Casablanca (1985).

She is an atheist but admires Pope Francis and Saint Januarius.

In March 2020, she was reported to have tested positive for COVID-19, but recovered after a few days.

Filmography 

 Sex for Sale (San Pasquale Baylonne protettore delle donne, 1976)
 Street of the Crane's Foot (1979)
 Hypochondriac (Il Malato immaginario, 1979)
 Scusate il ritardo (1982)
 Sciopèn (1982)
 The Pool Hustlers (Io, Chiara e lo scuro, 1982)
 A Proper Scandal (1984)
 Heart (Cuore, 1985, TV series)
 Casablanca, Casablanca (1985)
 Hundred Days in Palermo (1984)
 Let's Hope It's a Girl (Speriamo che sia femmina, 1986)
 Private Affairs (Ti presento un'amica, 1987)
 La piovra,  (1987, TV series)
 The Rogues (I Picari, 1988)
 What if Gargiulo Finds Out? (1988)
 Feu sur le candidat (1990)
 The Wicked (1991)
 Historical center (1992)
 For not forget (1992)
 Wolffs Revier (1993, TV episode)
 The True Life of Antonio H. (1994)
 Italians (1996)
 With Hate And With Love (1997)
 Besame mucho (1999)
  (2000, TV)
 Der Kapitän - Kein Hafen für die Anastasia (2000, TV)
 The beauty of the women (2001, TV series)
 I Love You Eugenio (Ti voglio bene Eugenio, 2002)
 Chemistry Forever (2002)
 Lights Turn Off (2004)
 The not long night (2006, TV)
 Il console Italiano (2011)

Notes

External links 

 

1956 births
Italian actresses
Living people
People from Cava de' Tirreni
David di Donatello winners
Nastro d'Argento winners
Ciak d'oro winners
Italian atheists